Nationality words link to articles with information on the nation's poetry or literature (for instance, Irish or France).

Events

The "Generation of '98" in Spain
The "Generation of '98" (also called "Generation of 1898", in Spanish, Generación del 98 or Generación de 1898) was a group of novelists, poets, essayists, and philosophers active in Spain at the time of the Spanish–American War. Jose Martínez Ruiz, commonly known as Azorín, comes up with the name in 1913 to allude to the moral, political, and social crisis produced by Spain's defeat. Writing mostly after 1910, the group reinvigorates Spanish letters, revives literary myths and breaks with classical schemes of literary genres. In politics, members of the movement often justify radicalism and rebellion.

Works published in English

Canada
 Bliss Carman, By the Aurelian Wall
 William Henry Drummond, Phil-o-rum’s Canoe and Madeleine Vercheres: Two Poems, New York: G.P. Putnam’s Sons.
 Charles G. D. Roberts, New York Nocturnes and Other Poems
 Duncan Campbell Scott, Labor and the Angel, including "The Onondaga Madonna", Canada

United Kingdom
 Alfred Austin:
 Lamia's Winter-Quarters
 Songs of England
 Robert Bridges, Poetical Works, Volume 1; published in six volumes through 1905
 Thomas Hardy, Wessex Poems and Other Verses
 W. E. Henley, Poems
 Henry Newbolt, The Island Race
 Stephen Phillips, Poems
 William Watson, The Hope of the World, and Other Poems
 Theodore Watts-Dunton, The Coming of Love, and Other Poems
 Oscar Wilde, published under the pen name "C.3.3" (in June the 7th edition is published under Wilde's name), The Ballad of Reading Gaol

United States
 Florence Earle Coates, Poems
 Paul Laurence Dunbar
 Folks from Dixie
 The Uncalled
 Louise Imogen Guiney, England and Yesterday
 Richard Hovey, Along the Trail: A Book of Lyrics
 Edgar Lee Masters, A Book of Verses
 Josephine Preston Peabody, The Wayfarers

Other in English
 Victor Daley, At Dawn and Dusk, Australia

Works published in other languages

France
 Francis Jammes:
 De l'Angélus de l'aube à l'Angélus du soir ("From the Morning Prayer to the Evening Prayer")
 Quatorze prières
 Charles Van Lerberghe, Entrevisions

Other languages
 Pieter Cornelis Boutens, Verzen ("Verses"), Netherlands
 José Santos Chocano, Selva virgen ("Virgin Jungle"), Peru
 Manilal Dwivedi, Amar Asha, India, Gujarati-language, in his magazine Sudarshan
 Naim Frashëri, Histori e Skënderbeut and Qerbelaja, Albania
 Chanda Jha, Mithila bhasa Ramayana, India, Maithili-language
 Gregorio Martínez Sierra, El poema del trabajo ("The poem of work"), Spain

Awards and honors

Births
Death years link to the corresponding "[year] in poetry" article:
 January 19 – Philip Child (died 1978), Canadian novelist and poet
 February 6 – Melvin B. Tolson (died 1966), African American Modernist poet, educator, columnist, trade unionist and politician
 February 9 – Yagi Jūkichi, 八木重吉 (died 1927), Japanese (surname: Yagi)
 February 18 – Luis Muñoz Marín (died 1980), Puerto Rican poet, journalist and politician
 February 19 – Richard Rudzitis (died 1960), Latvian poet, writer and philosopher
 March 9 – Fuyue Anzai 安西 冬衛 (died 1965), Japanese, poet and co-founder of the magazine Shi To Shiron ("Poetry and Poetics"), surname: Anzai
 March 20 – Luis Palés Matos (died 1959), Puerto Rican poet
 April 2 – Harindranath Chattopadhyay (died 1990), Indian poet writing in English and film actor
 April 10 – Horace Gregory (died 1982), American poet, translator, literary critic and academic; husband of poet and editor Marya Zaturenska
 April 24 – Govinda Krishna Chettur (died 1936), Indian poet writing in English
 April 26 – Vicente Aleixandre (died 1984), Spanish poet
 April 28 – William Soutar (died 1943), Scottish poet writing in English and Scots
 May 7 – Dorothy Vena Johnson (died 1970), African American educator and poet
 June 4 – Harry Crosby (died 1929), American publisher and poet
 June 5 – Federico García Lorca (killed 1936), Spanish poet
 June 13 – Anton Podbevšek (died 1981), Slovene avant-garde poet
 July 17 – Richard Harry Graves (died 1971), Australian
 July 22 – Stephen Vincent Benét (died 1943), American author, poet, short story writer and novelist
 August 15 – Jan Brzechwa (died 1966), Polish poet
 August 28 – Malcolm Cowley (died 1989), American novelist, poet, literary critic and journalist
 September 15 – J. Slauerhoff (died 1936), Dutch poet and novelist
 October 22 – Edgell Rickword (died 1982), English poet, critic, journalist, literary editor and a leading communist intellectual in the 1930s
 November 14 – Benjamin Fondane, né Wechsler (killed 1944), Romanian-French Symbolist poet, critic and existentialist philosopher

Deaths
Death years link to the corresponding "[year] in poetry" article:
 January 14 – Lewis Carroll (born 1832), English writer of fiction for children and nonsense verse
 January 26 – Cornelia J. M. Jordan (born 1830), U.S. poet and lyricist
 March 6 – Felice Cavallotti (born 1842), Italian poet, playwright and politician, killed in duel
 May 10 – Alexander MacGregor Rose (born 1846), Scottish-born Canadian poet
 July 20 – Jean Ingelow (born 1820), English poet and novelist
 July 24 – Evan MacColl (born 1808), Scottish-born Canadian poet writing in Scottish Gaelic and English
 September 9 – Stéphane Mallarmé (born 1842), French symbolist poet
 September 20 – Theodor Fontane (born 1819), German novelist and poet
 October 1 – Manilal Dwivedi (born 1858), Indian, Gujarati-language writer
 November 7 – Màiri Mhòr nan Òran (born 1821), Scottish Gaelic poet
 Kavishwar Dalpatram Dahyabhai, popularly known as "Dalpatram" (born 1820), Indian, Gujarati-language poet; father of poet Nanalal Dalpatram Kavi

See also

 19th century in poetry
 19th century in literature
 List of years in poetry
 List of years in literature
 Victorian literature
 French literature of the 19th century
 Symbolist poetry
 Young Poland (Młoda Polska) a modernist period in Polish  arts and literature, roughly from 1890 to 1918
 Poetry

References

19th-century poetry
Poetry